"Falling for the First Time" is the third single by Canadian group the Barenaked Ladies from their 2000 album, Maroon. The song was composed by Steven Page and Ed Robertson. The song also appears on the band's 2001 compilation album, Disc One: All Their Greatest Hits and the soundtrack of the TV show, Malcolm in the Middle. Following the terrorist attacks on September 11, 2001, the song was placed on the list of post-9/11 inappropriate titles distributed by Clear Channel.

Music video
The music video begins with a security guard at a museum (played by BNL's keyboardist Kevin Hearn's cousin Harland Williams) who is bored watching the camera monitors decides to change the channel to a TV station. The only channel to pop up shows the band playing the song, despite efforts by the guard to return the monitors to normal. Enraged the guard takes the camera monitor and tosses it into the garbage bin. As the guard returns to his desk the song has just ended, in the background the band can be seen leaving with several pieces of stolen artwork from the museum along with taking the monitor he just tossed, revealing that the video was used to distract the guard.

A shortened version exists that was made in conjunction with Kids' WB as part of their interstitial "Top Tune Toons". It uses the clip of the band playing from the original video, but mixes with clips from the then current programming block's line up which included Static Shock, ¡Mucha Lucha!, Scooby-Doo, Where Are You!, Pokémon, Yu-Gi-Oh!, Jackie Chan Adventures, X-Men: Evolution and The Mummy.

Critical response
Rolling Stone magazine said that the single "strives to translate the emotional rush of falling in love into a swirling, shimmering wall of sound—with a nice detour for the earthbound observation, 'anyone perfect must be lying.'"  Billboard said the song was "shimmering."

Personnel
 Ed Robertson – lead vocals, acoustic and electric guitars
 Steven Page – acoustic and electric guitars, backing vocals
 Jim Creeggan – electric bass, backing vocals
 Kevin Hearn – piano, synthesizer, backing vocals
 Tyler Stewart – drums, backing vocals
 Rob Menegoni – tambourine

Charts

Year-end charts

Footnotes

2000 singles
Barenaked Ladies songs
Songs written by Ed Robertson
Songs written by Steven Page
Song recordings produced by Don Was
2000 songs
Reprise Records singles